Tunbridge Wells railway station is on the Hastings line in the south of England and serves Royal Tunbridge Wells in Kent. It is  down the line from London Charing Cross. The station and all trains serving it are operated by Southeastern.

History 
The first station was a temporary terminus opened on 20 September 1845 situated north of Wells Tunnel. This closed when the line was extended to the present station which opened on 25 November 1846. It became a through station in 1851 when the line opened to Robertsbridge and a year later opened through to Hastings. The LBSCR line from Grove Junction to Tunbridge Wells (West) opened in 1867 for goods and 1876 for passenger. Immediately after becoming part of the Southern Railway in 1923 the station was named Tunbridge Wells Central.

Just beyond Grove Tunnel at the south end of the station was Grove Junction, where trains took the single line branch to Tunbridge Wells West. The branch closed on 6 July 1985.

In 1985 preparation for electrification the platforms were rebuilt and the tracks were resignalled. Electric trains started running in 1986. The station again became just Tunbridge Wells.

Since 1974, the up side of the station only has been Grade II listed.

Services 
All services at Tunbridge Wells are operated by Southeastern using ,  and  EMUs.

The typical off-peak service in trains per hour is:
 2 tph to London Charing Cross via 

During the peak hours, the station is served by additional services to and from London Charing Cross which terminate at Tunbridge Wells.

References

External links 

Railway stations in Royal Tunbridge Wells
DfT Category C1 stations
Former South Eastern Railway (UK) stations
Railway stations in Great Britain opened in 1846
Railway stations served by Southeastern
Grade II listed railway stations
Grade II listed buildings in Kent